Steven Anthony Wilson (born August 24, 1957) is a former American football defensive back in the National Football League for the Dallas Cowboys and Denver Broncos. He played college football at Howard University. Wilson was most recently the assistant defensive backs/special teams coach for the DC Defenders of the XFL. He was the former head football coach at his alma mater Howard University, from 1989 to 2001, and Texas Southern University, from 2004 to 2007.

Early years
Wilson attended Northern High School where he played defensive back and wide receiver. He was invited to the North-South Senior All-Star Game as a senior.

He accepted a scholarship to play for Howard University, where he focused on playing wide receiver. As a senior, he set single-season school records for catches (94), receiving yards (1,339), touchdown receptions (12) and kickoff returns (40). He graduated as the school's all-time leading receiver and kick returner.

In 2013, he was inducted into the Mid-Eastern Athletic Conference hall of fame. In 2012, he received MEAC/SWAC Challenge Legend honors. He also was inducted into the Black College Hall of Fame.

Professional career

Dallas Cowboys
Wilson was not selected in the 1979 NFL Draft and was signed as an undrafted free agent by the Dallas Cowboys. Although he was initially waived on August 14, he was re-signed on August 29 for depth purposes, after Butch Johnson was injured. He led the team in punt returns as a rookie.

He was converted into a cornerback in his second season, with 11 starts, 48 tackles, 4 interceptions and 41 passes defensed (led the team).

In 1981, he started 4 games before being replaced with rookie Everson Walls, who received Pro Bowl honors at the end of the season. In 1982, he was moved back to wide receiver before being released on September 3.

Denver Broncos
Wilson signed as a free agent with the Denver Broncos on September 14, 1982, after Steve Foley broke his arm in the first game of the season.

In 1983, he started 3 games after injuries to Foley and Dennis Smith, forced the team to make changes in the defensive backfield. In 1985, he started four of the first five games because of injuries and finished with 3 interceptions, 12 passes defensed and a fumble recovery.

In 1987, he started at right cornerback the last 5 regular season games and all the playoff games, including Super Bowl XXII. He was waived on August, 29, 1988, only to be re-signed on September 28, after the team experienced a rash of injuries.

During his time with the Broncos he was a dependable player (missing 4 games) and although he was used primarily as a backup, he was always among the team leaders in interceptions, finishing his career ranked ninth (16) in franchise history.

Coaching career
Wilson led the Howard Bison football team to the Mideastern Athletic Conference and Black College National championship twice (1993, 1996). His 1993 team had an 11-0 record and qualified for the school's first Division I-AA (now FCS) playoff appearance. His coaching record was 78 wins, 67 losses and received MEAC Coach of the Year honors twice (1989, 1993).

He spent three seasons as the defensive coordinator for Bowie State University. In 2004, he was hired as the head coach of Texas Southern. His coaching record was 4 wins, 40 losses.

In 2019, he was named the special teams coordinator and defensive backs coach for the DC Defenders of the XFL.

Personal life
Wilson's father, Tommy Wilson, played eight seasons in the National Football League (NFL) and was a Pro Bowl player.

Head coaching record

References

External links
 

1957 births
Living people
American football cornerbacks
American football safeties
American football wide receivers
Bowie State Bulldogs football coaches
Dallas Cowboys players
DC Defenders coaches
Denver Broncos players
Howard Bison football coaches
Howard Bison football players
Texas Southern Tigers football coaches
Sportspeople from Durham, North Carolina
Sports coaches from Los Angeles
Coaches of American football from North Carolina
Players of American football from Los Angeles
Players of American football from North Carolina
African-American coaches of American football
African-American players of American football
20th-century African-American sportspeople
21st-century African-American sportspeople